Hatley is a surname. Notable people with the surname include:

Charles Hatley (born 1986), American boxer
John Hatley (c. 1762 – 1832), English Royal Navy officer
John E. Hatley (born 1968), United States Army soldier
Johnny Hatley (1930-2002), American football coach and player
Marvin Hatley (1905–1986), American film composer and music director
Neal Hatley (born 1969), English rugby union player
Rickey Hatley (born 1994), American football player
Simon Hatley, English sailor and privateer
Tim Hatley (born 1967), British scenic designer